David John King (24 October 1940 – 16 July 2010) was an English professional footballer who played as an inside forward in the Football League for Hull City, and in non-League football for King's Lynn.

References

1940 births
2010 deaths
Footballers from Kingston upon Hull
English footballers
Association football forwards
Hull City A.F.C. players
King's Lynn F.C. players
English Football League players